

Watercraft

Cutters

Originally, the Coast Guard used the term cutter in its traditional sense, as a type of small sailing ship.

Smaller cutters come under control of district commands. Cutters usually carry a motor surf boat and/or a rigid-hulled inflatable boat. Polar-class icebreakers (WAGB) carry an Arctic survey boat (ASB) and landing craft.

Any Coast Guard crew with officers or petty officers assigned has law-enforcement authority (14 USC Sec. 89) and can conduct armed boardings.

Boats
The Coast Guard boat fleet includes

USCG Auxiliary 
Auxiliary Operational Facilities: The Coast Guard surface fleet is augmented by privately owned vessels operated by the United States Coast Guard Auxiliary.

Aircraft

The Coast Guard operates about 210 aircraft. Fixed-wing aircraft (such as Lockheed HC-130 Hercules turboprops) operate from Air Stations on long-duration missions. Helicopters (Aérospatiale HH-65 Dolphin and Sikorsky HH-60J Jayhawk) operate from Air Stations, Air Facilities, and flight-deck equipped cutters, and can rescue people or intercept smuggling vessels. Some special MH- designated helicopters are armed with guns and some are equipped with armor to protect against small arms fire.

The Coast Guard flies several aircraft types:

The Coast Guard was to purchase the Bell Eagle Eye UAV as part of the Deepwater program, but this has been cancelled. The Coast Guard is currently preparing to launch a small UAS competition for the Legend-class NSC and future Heritage-class cutter.

In addition to regular Coast Guard aircraft, privately owned general aviation aircraft are used by Coast Guard Auxiliarists for patrols and search-and-rescue missions.

Land vehicles

Electronic Warfare Systems 
 Sea Commander Aegis derived combat system
 SCCS-Lite combat data system
 AN/SLQ-32B(V)2 Electronic Warfare System
 L-3 C4ISR suite
 AN/SPS-78 surface search and navigation radar
 AN/SPS-50 surface search radar
 AN/APX-123(V)1 IFF (ship automation provided by MTU Callosum)

Shipboard Weapon Systems

Decoys and Countermeasures

Weapons

Communications

Coast Guard radio stations cover a wide geographical area using very high frequency and high frequency radios. There are eight major radio stations covering long-range transmissions and an extensive network of VHF radio stations along the nation's coastline and inland rivers.

The current communication system is the Rescue 21. Rescue 21 is an advanced maritime command, control, and communications (C3) system.

The OMEGA navigation system and the LORAN-C transmitters outside the USA were run until 1994 also by the United States Coast Guard, and LORAN-C transmitters within the US were decommissioned on June 1, 2010, with the exception of 5 CONUS LORAN-C stations that continue to be staffed due to international agreements.

See also
 Equipment of the United States Army
 Equipment of the United States Air Force
 Equipment of the United States Navy
 Equipment of the United States Marine Corps

References 

United States Coast Guard